The 2012 IAAF Road Race Label Events were the fifth edition of the global series of road running competitions given Label status by the International Association of Athletics Federations (IAAF). All five World Marathon Majors had Gold Label status. The series included a total of 71 road races: 35 Gold, 21 Silver and 15 Bronze. In terms of distance, 44 races were marathons, 14 were half marathons, 10 were 10K runs, and 4 were held over other distances.

The 2012 New York City Marathon scheduled for 4 November was cancelled due to Hurricane Sandy.

Races

References

Race calendar
Calendar 2012 IAAF Label Road Races. IAAF. Retrieved 2019-09-22.

2012
IAAF Road Race Label Events